Prayer plant may refer to:

Marantaceae, commonly called "prayer plants", since their leaves raise at the evening and look as if they're praying
Calathea, a genus of the above family that are called "prayer plants"
Goeppertia, a genus where many species of Calathea have been reassigned  
Maranta leuconeura, a popular houseplant species in this family